More Than Friends is a South Korean television series starring Ong Seong-wu, Shin Ye-eun, and Kim Dong-jun. It aired on JTBC from September 25 to November 28, 2020.

Synopsis
Ten years ago, Kyung Woo Yeon (Shin Ye-eun) was as innocent and carefree as any eighteen year old might be. With dreams and ambitions and a heart ready to love, it was only a matter of time before she fell for someone. And fall she did... for her friend, Lee Soo (Ong Seong-wu). Little did she know that at the time, Lee Soo also had a crush on her. Unfortunately, a simple misunderstanding kept them from confessing their feelings.

A decade later, Woo Yeon still harbors a crush on Lee Soo. Working as a calligrapher, she still keeps in touch with her friend but has never confessed her feelings for him. Oddly enough, the same could be said for Lee Soo, who is now working as a professional photographer. Though the two have taken turns having a crush on each other for over ten years, misunderstandings and missed timings have continued to keep them from becoming anything more than friends.

With feelings ten years in the making, Woo Yeon and Lee Soo begin to realize their feelings for each other are becoming too strong to keep hidden. Has the time for their confessions finally come or will yet another misunderstanding keep them apart...

Cast

Main
 Ong Seong-wu as Lee Soo: a well-known photographer and Woo-Yeon's friend since high school. He used to be very popular in school due to his looks and often appeared cold. He realized his feeling for Woo-yeon later when she started to date Jun-soo. He despises his parents for neglecting him and focusing on their divorce.
 Ha Yi-an as young Lee Soo
 Shin Ye-eun as Kyung Woo-yeon: A cheerful person who received many awards in school but now works as a calligraphist and has a part-time job. She had a crush on Lee Soo for over 10 years but got rejected twice. She dates men thinking she will fall for him after dating but her conflicting feeling for Lee-soo always gets in the way.  
 Shim Hye-yeon as young Woo-yeon
 Kim Dong-jun as On Joon-soo: The CEO of a huge Publishing house. His first love ended up being his sister-in-law. He fell for Woo-yeon after a few encounters.

Supporting
 Pyo Ji-hoon as Jin Sang-hyuk: good friend of the gang (Woo-Yeon, Lee soo, Young-hee, Hyun Jae and Jin Joo) owns a small restaurant Tonight where the friends frequently meet.
 Baek Soo-min as Han Jin-Joo: A rich prosecutor who has never dated. Best friend of Woo Yeon.
 Ahn Eun-jin as Kim Young-hee: An ordinary office worker who despises her mother and is in a relationship with Hyun Jae for over 10 years. She avoids marrying Hyun-jae because of her poor family.
 Ahn Se Bin as young Young-hee
 Choi Chan-ho as Shin Hyun-jae: Young-hee's boyfriend who has been wanting to marry her for a long time but patiently waits till Young-hee is ready. 
 Ahn Nae-sang as Lee Young-hwan: Lee Soo's father who still has feelings for his wife even after getting divorced. He is a retired judge.
 Kim Hee-jung as Choi Won-jung: Lee Soo's mom who is an artist.
 Jo Ryun as Park Mi-sook: Woo-yeon's mother.
 Seo Sang-won as Kyung Man-ho: Woo yeon's father.
 Yang Hee-jae as Chul-soo
 Kang Yoon-je as Joon-young
 Oh Hee-joon as Min Sang-shik: Jun-su's good friend and colleague.
 Jung Mi-hyung as Min-ah
 Yoon Bok-in as Oh Yoon-ja: Young hee's mother.
 Kim Dal-yul as Kim Chul-soo
 Baek Seo-yi as Hwang Ji-hyun
 Bae Da-bin as Kwon Yoo-ra, Lee Soo's 'girlfriend'
 Kim Dan-yool as Kim Chul-soo
Wang Hee-jae as young Chul-soo

Special appearances
 Woo Hyun as Mr. Han (Ep. 2)

Episodes

Original soundtrack

Part 1

Part 2

Part 3

Part 4

Part 5

Part 6

Part 7

Part 8

Part 9

Production

Development
Early working title of the series is Number of Cases Friends Become Lovers.

Casting
On February 18, 2020, news outlet Osen reported that Ong Seong-wu would play the lead role of the series. The same day, another news outlet revealed that Shin Ye-eun would be Ong's co-star. Fantagio and Npio Entertainment (respectively Ong and Shin's agencies) confirmed that they were both positively reviewing the offer but that nothing had been decided yet. On March 25, Kim Dong-jun's agency confirmed that the actor had joined the main cast. The final lineup was confirmed on April 9.

Filming
Part of filming took place in Jeju Island. Production was halted during the last week of August 2020 after Kim Hee-jung came in contact with Kim Won-hae, who tested positive for COVID-19, on another filming set. Filming resumed after the tests came back negative.

Release
The first trailer for the series was released on August 7, 2020. The second trailer was released in August 20 and revealed that the series would premiere on September 18. On September 4, the premiere was postponed by a week after filming was halted at the end of August.

Ratings

International broadcast
The series is available on iQIYI with multi-languages subtitles in South East Asia, Taiwan, Hong Kong and Macau on its first run. The series also available in VIU in South East Asia and in Viki labeled as an original in selected territories. It's available on Indian subcontinent in Disney+Hotstar

Notes

References

External links
  
 More Than Friends on iQIYI
 

JTBC television dramas
Korean-language television shows
2020 South Korean television series debuts
2020 South Korean television series endings
South Korean romantic comedy television series
Television productions suspended due to the COVID-19 pandemic
Television series by JTBC Studios